Mardan Sports Complex  is located in Mardan in Khyber Pakhtunkhwa province of Pakistan. The complex has facilities for all major sports such as Cricket, Football, Hockey, Swimming Pool, Basketball, Volleyball, Squash Court, Indoor Female Gymnasium, Climbing Wall and Open Air Gym.

History and development 
Mardan Sports Complex is a multiple purpose sports complex located in Sheikh Maltoon Town Mardan. It was constructed in 2006 by Mardan district government with the help of Government of Pakistan.This sports complex was built on the cost of Rs. 33.4 Crore. Initially, facilities for cricket, football, basketball and volleyball were made available. The swimming pool facility was then built in 2011 at the cost of Rs.50 million while in 2016, the PTI led government of Khyber Pakhtunkhwa constructed an international standard hockey turf at the sports complex at the cost Rs.67.69 million.

Sporting facilities 
Mardan Sports Complex currently hold sporting facilities for the following sports.
 Hockey Ground 
 Football Ground
 Cricket Ground
 Athletics track
 Boxing
 Swimming pool
 Indoor facilities for Badminton
 Table Tennis
 Judo, wushu and taekwondo

See also 
 Qayyum Stadium
 Hayatabad Sports Complex
 Abdul Wali Khan Sports Complex
 Swat Sports Complex

References 

Indoor arenas in Pakistan
Stadiums in Pakistan
Cricket grounds in Pakistan
Boxing venues in Pakistan
Sport in Khyber Pakhtunkhwa
Judo venues
Mardan